WSYC-FM (88.7 FM) is an adult album alternative and variety formatted broadcast radio station licensed to and serving Shippensburg, Pennsylvania, United States. WSYC is owned and operated by Shippensburg University of Pennsylvania.

Programming
The format is dedicated to showcasing new bands and artists that mainstream stations have yet to discover. Programming on WSYC-FM includes the college radio classics, independent labels and artists, various specialty shows featuring specific genres, news updates, and talk shows.

WSYC-FM is also the Red Raider Sports Network, broadcasting all Red Raider football and basketball games, as well as other Raiders sports.

WSYC-FM is also the home to the popularly viewed sports talk show, "The Bottom Line", hosted by student JD Dorazio.

Lastly, WSYC-FM has hosted an annual event, "Up All Night", since 2012. Shippensburg University students can win various prizes over a 24 period that includes DJ sets, live music, and commentary. "Up All Night" was founded by alumni Matthew Kanzler.

External links
88-7 WSYC online

SYC-FM
SYC-FM
Adult album alternative radio stations in the United States
Adult hits radio stations in the United States
Radio stations established in 1975
1975 establishments in Pennsylvania
Shippensburg University of Pennsylvania